Jason Da Costa (born 20 June 1970, in London) is an English autodidact in the art and science of the aeroplane and  flight simulation  technology. His work in adapting computer based flight simulation technology with complete replication of airliner cockpits has attained industry recognition.

Da Costa's aviation endeavours include aerospace technology coursework, flight phobia solutions, lower cost flight simulation design and function.

References
canada.com
straight.com
thestar.com
Business in Vancouver

British aerospace engineers
Living people
1970 births
People educated at Latymer Upper School